The following is a list of aquarium diseases. Aquarium fish are often susceptible to numerous diseases, due to the artificially limited and concentrated environment. New fish can sometimes introduce diseases to aquaria, and these can be difficult to diagnose and treat. Most fish diseases are also aggravated when the fish is stressed.

Common aquarium diseases include the following:

Freshwater

Saltwater 

 Cryptocaryon (marine ich)
 Marine velvet or coral reef fish disease
 Anemonefish disease

Both

Uncategorized 

 Myxobacteriosis
 Ichthyobodo (costia)

Quarantine
The goal of quarantine is to prevent problems in the main tank due to sickness. A quarantine tank should be used before to introduce any newly acquired animals in the main tank and to treat fish that are already sick. By doing this, the aquarist can avoid the spread of the disease and make it easier to treat the fish.

See also 
Fish diseases and parasites

References

Bibliography
 Encyclopedia of Aquarium and Pond Fish (2005) (David Alderton), DK Publishing,

External links
Help with Stress, Disease and Death
Theaquariumwiki.com

Diseases
Fish diseases
Aquarium